In mathematics, the prime zeta function is an analogue of the Riemann zeta function, studied by . It is defined as the following infinite series, which converges for :

Properties 

The Euler product for the  Riemann zeta function ζ(s) implies that
 
which by Möbius inversion gives

When s goes to 1, we have .
This is used in the definition of Dirichlet density.

The line  is a natural boundary as the singularities cluster near all points of this line.

If one defines a sequence

then

(Exponentiation shows that this is equivalent to Lemma 2.7 by Li.)

The prime zeta function is related to Artin's constant by

 

where Ln is the nth Lucas number.

Specific values are:

Analysis

Integral

The integral over the prime zeta function is usually anchored at infinity,
because the pole at  prohibits defining a nice lower bound
at some finite integer without entering a discussion on branch cuts in the complex plane:

The noteworthy values are again those where the sums converge slowly:

Derivative
The first derivative is

 

The interesting values are again those where the sums converge slowly:

Generalizations

Almost-prime zeta functions
As the Riemann zeta function is a sum of inverse powers over the integers
and the prime zeta function a sum of inverse powers of the prime numbers,
the k-primes (the integers which are a product of  not
necessarily distinct primes) define a sort of intermediate sums:

 

where  is the total number of prime factors.

Each integer in the denominator of the Riemann zeta function 
may be classified by its value of the index , which decomposes the Riemann zeta
function into an infinite sum of the :

Since we know that the Dirichlet series (in some formal parameter u) satisfies 

we can use formulas for the symmetric polynomial variants with a generating function of the right-hand-side type. Namely, we have the coefficient-wise identity that  when the sequences correspond to  where  denotes the characteristic function of the primes. Using Newton's identities, we have a general formula for these sums given by 

 

Special cases include the following explicit expansions:

Prime modulo zeta functions
Constructing the sum not over all primes but only over primes which are in the same modulo class introduces further types of infinite series that are a reduction of the Dirichlet L-function.

See also 
 Divergence of the sum of the reciprocals of the primes

References

External links 
 

Zeta and L-functions